Theodore Lewis Bachman Jr. (born January 19, 1952) is a former American football defensive back who played one season in the National Football League with the Seattle Seahawks and Miami Dolphins. Bachman  played college football at New Mexico State University and attended Sherman E. Burroughs High School in Ridgecrest, California. He was also a member of the Calgary Stampeders of the Canadian Football League.

External links
Just Sports Stats

Living people
1952 births
Players of American football from Pensacola, Florida
Players of Canadian football from Pensacola, Florida
American football defensive backs
Canadian football defensive backs
African-American players of American football
African-American players of Canadian football
New Mexico State Aggies football players
Calgary Stampeders players
Seattle Seahawks players
Miami Dolphins players
21st-century African-American people
20th-century African-American sportspeople